Sierzchów may refer to the following places:
Sierzchów, Greater Poland Voivodeship (west-central Poland)
Sierzchów, Łódź Voivodeship (central Poland)
Sierzchów, Masovian Voivodeship (east-central Poland)